The canton of Vigeois is a former administrative division situated in the Corrèze département and in the Limousin region of France. It was disbanded following the French canton reorganisation which came into effect in March 2015. It consisted of 6 communes, which joined the canton of Allassac in 2015. It had 3,908 inhabitants (2012).

The canton comprised the following communes:
Estivaux
Orgnac-sur-Vézère
Perpezac-le-Noir
Saint-Bonnet-l'Enfantier
Troche
Vigeois

Demographics

See also
Cantons of the Corrèze department

References

Former cantons of Corrèze
2015 disestablishments in France
States and territories disestablished in 2015